Glenhaven (formerly, Gum Tree Point) is an unincorporated community in Lake County, California.

References

External links

Unincorporated communities in California
Unincorporated communities in Lake County, California